Nicholas George Roman (September 23, 1947 – May 18, 2003) was an American football defensive end who played five seasons in the National Football League (NFL) with the Cincinnati Bengals and Cleveland Browns. He was drafted by the Bengals in the tenth round of the 1970 NFL Draft. He played college football at Ohio State University and attended Canton McKinley High School in Canton, Ohio. His parents were Romanian immigrants. Roman died of a heart attack at his home in Columbus, Ohio on May 18, 2003.

References

External links
Just Sports Stats

1947 births
2003 deaths
Players of American football from Canton, Ohio
American football defensive ends
American people of Romanian descent
Ohio State Buckeyes football players
Cincinnati Bengals players
Cleveland Browns players